Conasprella spirofilis is a species of sea snail, a marine gastropod mollusk in the family Conidae, the cone snails and their allies.

Like all species within the genus Conasprella, these cone snails are predatory and venomous. They are capable of "stinging" humans, therefore live ones should be handled carefully or not at all.

Description
The size of the shell varies between 19 mm and 37 mm.

Distribution
This marine species occurs off the Philippines and Japan.

References

 Puillandre N., Duda T.F., Meyer C., Olivera B.M. & Bouchet P. (2015). One, four or 100 genera? A new classification of the cone snails. Journal of Molluscan Studies. 81: 1–23

External links
  The Conus Biodiversity website
 Cone Shells – Knights of the Sea
 

spirofilis
Gastropods described in 1970